Qasemabad in Qazvin Province may refer to:

Qasemabad, alternate name of Jannatabad, Qazvin
Qasemabad, Takestan, in the Central District of Takestan County
Qasemabad, Khorramdasht, in Khorramdasht District, Takestan County